is a Japanese short track speed skater. She competed at the 1998 Winter Olympics, the 2002 Winter Olympics and the 2006 Winter Olympics.

References

External links
 

1973 births
Living people
Japanese female short track speed skaters
Olympic short track speed skaters of Japan
Short track speed skaters at the 1998 Winter Olympics
Short track speed skaters at the 2002 Winter Olympics
Short track speed skaters at the 2006 Winter Olympics
Sportspeople from Nagano Prefecture
Asian Games medalists in short track speed skating
Short track speed skaters at the 1999 Asian Winter Games
Medalists at the 1999 Asian Winter Games
Asian Games silver medalists for Japan
20th-century Japanese women